is a Japanese television drama ran on TV Tokyo from 4 October 2013 to December 20. The series bases on Japanese video game industry since 1983 to 2013, featured three high school students' growing up.

Several famous games appeared in the show, such as Xevious, Pac-Man and Dragon Quest II.

Cast 
 Reiji Watanabe (渡辺 礼治) - Kei Tanaka
 Fumiyoshi Takano (高野 文美) - Haru
 Akinobu Kido (木戸 明信) - Hamano Kenta
 Masashi Watanabe (渡辺 雅史) - Jirō Satō

References

External links 
  

2013 Japanese television series debuts
2013 Japanese television series endings
TV Tokyo original programming
Television shows about video games